Hillsboro is a city in and the county seat of Hill County, Texas, United States. The population was 8,221 at the 2020 census.

History
Hillsboro was named for Hill County.
At one point during Bonnie and Clyde's robberies in Hillsboro, they took the Peterson family hostage at their own farm. Later the Petersons said that Bonnie and Clyde held them at gunpoint until they surrendered their barn for them to sleep in for a few nights before running again.

The city is known for its abundance of restored Victorian homes and its historic county courthouse, which on January 1, 1993, was heavily damaged by an electrical fire. It was rebuilt, courtesy of donations from around the world and two concerts sponsored by Hill County native Willie Nelson. The courthouse won the Downtown Association's 1999 award for "Best Restoration". The renovation sparked an interest in restoring Texas's historic courthouses.

Geography

Hillsboro is located near the geographic center of Hill County at  (32.009557, –97.124437). Interstate 35 runs through the eastern side of the city, with access from Exits 364 through 370. The I-35E/I-35W split is just north of the city limits.

Texas State Highway 22 runs through the center of Hillsboro on West Elm Street, South Waco Street, and Corsicana Highway. It leads west  to Lake Whitney and east  to Corsicana. Texas State Highway 171 passes through Hillsboro with Highway 22, but leads northwest  to Cleburne and southeast  to Hubbard.

Demographics

2020 census

As of the 2020 United States census, there were 8,221 people, 2,925 households, and 2,024 families residing in the city.

2000 census
As of the census of 2000, there were 8,232 people, 2,876 households, and 1,909 families residing in the city. The population density was 908.1 people per square mile (350.4/km2). There were 3,227 housing units at an average density of 356.0 per square mile (137.4/km2). The racial makeup of the city was 69.17% White, 16.16% African American, 0.29% Native American, 0.56% Asian, 0.06% Pacific Islander, 11.44% from other races, and 2.32% from two or more races. 28.26% of the population were Hispanic or Latino of any race.

There were 2,876 households, out of which 33.4% had children under the age of 18 living with them, 47.3% were married couples living together, 14.4% had a female householder with no husband present, and 33.6% were non-families. 30.0% of all households were made up of individuals, and 14.8% had someone living alone who was 65 years of age or older. The average household size was 2.69 and the average family size was 3.34.

In the city, the population was spread out, with 27.7% under the age of 18, 12.5% from 18 to 24, 25.2% from 25 to 44, 17.6% from 45 to 64, and 16.9% who were 65 years of age or older. The median age was 32 years. For every 100 females, there were 95.8 males. For every 100 females age 18 and over, there were 89.9 males.

The median income for a household in the city was $26,017, and the median income for a family was $30,297. Males had a median income of $22,393 versus $20,652 for females. The per capita income for the city was $12,576. About 17.6% of families and 21.8% of the population were below the poverty line, including 26.3% of those under age 18 and 19.6% of those age 65 or over.

Education
The city is served by the Hillsboro Independent School District.

Hill College, a comprehensive community college, is located on the east side of I-35.

Culture
Hillsboro was the first home of the Texas Musicians Museum, which relocated to nearby Waxahachie in Ellis County for a short while, until the building owners filed for bankruptcy. The museum is now open in a new facility in downtown Irving.

Located a few miles northwest of Hillsboro, the Middlefaire site features a Renaissance Festival and Texas Pirate Festival.

The movie Bottle Rocket, starring Owen and Luke Wilson, was filmed here. They used the Days Inn motel, the Hillsboro High School football stadium, and Highway 171 leading out of Hillsboro.

National Register of Historic Places
 Farmers National Bank 68 W. Elm St.
 Gebhardt Bakery 119 E. Franklin St.
 Grimes Garage 110 N. Waco St.
 Grimes House Country Club Rd. and Corporation St.
 Hill County Courthouse Courthouse Sq.
 Hill County Jail N. Waco St.
 Hillsboro Cotton Mills 220 N. Houston St.
 Hillsboro Residential Historic District Roughly bounded by Country Club Rd., Thompson, Corsicana, Pleasant, Franklin, and Elm Sts.
 McKenzie Site Address Restricted
 Missouri-Kansas-Texas Company Railroad Station Covington St.
 Old Rock Saloon 58 W. Elm St.
 Sturgis National Bank S. Waco and W. Elm Sts.
 Tarleton Building 110 E. Franklin St.
 U.S. Post Office 118 S. Waco St.
 Western Union Building 107 S. Covington St.

Notable people

 Jerry Allison, drummer for The Crickets
 Madge Bellamy, film actress of the 1920s and '30s, best known for the horror classic White Zombie
 Robert Lee Bobbitt, former Speaker of the Texas House of Representatives, state attorney general, and chairman of the Texas Highway Commission
 Bob Bullock, former Texas lieutenant governor, comptroller, secretary of state, and state representative
 Richard H. Carmichael, United States Army general
 Vara Martin Daniel - American educator and First Lady of Guam.
 Troy Dungan, WFAA-TV chief weather forecaster
 Roger Edens, Hollywood producer, composer, and vocal arranger
 Mike Harris, basketball player
 Rafer Johnson, the 1960 Olympic decathlon gold medalist
 Bob Johnston, record producer, songwriter, and musician
 Maggie Jones, blues singer and pianist
 Crawford Martin, former Attorney General of Texas, Texas Secretary of State, Texas State Senator, and mayor of Hillsboro
 Dr. J. Vernon McGee, Theologian, Bible teacher, pastor, radio broadcaster 
 Billy Patterson, former NFL football player
 Mary Ellen Rudin, American mathematician; professor Emerita at the University of Wisconsin.
 Drew Nellins Smith, author
 Derel Walker, CFL football player

Climate
The climate in this area is characterized by hot, humid summers and generally mild to cool winters.  According to the Köppen Climate Classification system, Hillsboro has a humid subtropical climate, abbreviated "Cfa" on climate maps.

References

External links

 City of Hillsboro official website
 Hillsboro Chamber of Commerce
 

Cities in Hill County, Texas
Cities in Texas
County seats in Texas